Wild Birds: 1985–1995 is a compilation album of Peter Murphy's songs that was released in 2000.

Track listing 
 "Cuts You Up" (Edit) (4:57)
 "Subway" (4:36)
 "The Scarlet Thing in You" (4:18)
 "Indigo Eyes" (Edit) (4:09)
 "Keep Me from Harm" (Edit) (4:01)
 "Final Solution" (3:56)
 "Deep Ocean Vast Sea" (4:08)
 "Strange Kind of Love" (3:47)
 "Hit Song" (Single Edit) (4:44)
 "Huuvola" (5:51)
 "All Night Long" (Single Edit) (4:37)
 "Dragnet Drag" (Edit) (5:03)
 "I'll Fall With Your Knife" (4:25)
 "The Sweetest Drop" (4:16)
 "Roll Call" (6:34)
 "Jemal" (Version 2) (5:32)

References

Peter Murphy (musician) albums
2000 greatest hits albums
Beggars Banquet Records compilation albums